BB Jodi or Bigg Boss Jodi is a 2022 Indian-Telugu-language reality television Dance show, which premiered on 25 December 2022 and broadcast on Star Maa and streamed on Disney+ Hotstar.

Format
The show has the concept of Bigg Boss celebrities competing against one another. The show follows the format in Bigg Boss will showcase the dance talents of all the loved Bigg Boss participants from the previous seasons.But the twist is they will have to perform in pairs or Jodis so as to sustain in the show.

Later on, they will be judged and eliminated on the basis of their performances and the last remaining Jodi will be considered as the winner of Bigg Boss Jodi.

Series overview

Season 1
The first season aired on every Sunday from 25 December 2022. Sadha,Radha (actress) and Tarun Master as the judges, Television host Sreemukhi as the host.

Contestants

Adaptations

References

Star Maa original programming
Telugu-language television shows
Television shows set in Andhra Pradesh
2022 Indian television series debuts
Telugu-language television series based on Tamil-language television series